The Frisco Bridge, previously known as the Memphis Bridge, is a cantilevered through truss bridge carrying a rail line across the Mississippi River between West Memphis, Arkansas, and Memphis, Tennessee.

Construction
At the time of the Memphis bridge construction, it was a significant technological challenge and is considered to be chief engineer George S. Morison's crowning achievement. No other bridges had ever been attempted on the Lower Mississippi River.

The bridge is built entirely of open-hearth steel, a newly developed material at the time of construction. The structure features a  main span and two additional  spans. Its  height above the water was the highest clearance of any U.S. bridge of that era.

Though some sources claim two cantilevered roadways were added to the bridge in the 1930s, one on each side, they probably confuse this bridge with the neighboring Harahan Bridge, which had two cantilevered roadways from 1917 until the Memphis & Arkansas Bridge opened in 1949. (The former roadway on the north side of the Harahan Bridge is now designated as Big River Crossing, having been refitted to carry pedestrian and bicycle traffic across the Mississippi River in 2016.) While the Frisco Bridge has not featured cantilevered roadways, pedestrians, buggies, and some automobiles used its main deck before the Harahan Bridge opened (the bridge was closed to such traffic while a train was crossing).

Construction for the Kansas City, Fort Scott and Memphis Railway, later acquired by the "Frisco," began in 1888 and was completed May 12, 1892. In the end the project created a bridge that was the farthest south on the Mississippi River, featured the longest truss span in the United States and cost nearly 3 million dollars.

A testament to its design and construction, the bridge is still used by BNSF Railway and is being renovated as part of a system-wide BNSF infrastructure improvement program. The west approach to the bridge, which was made of 52 spans totaling  in length, was replaced by a new 27-span bridge. This project was completed in 2017. The bridge was designated as a National Historic Civil Engineering Landmark in 1987.

See also
List of bridges documented by the Historic American Engineering Record in Arkansas
List of bridges documented by the Historic American Engineering Record in Tennessee
List of crossings of the Lower Mississippi River

References

External links

, discusses Chief Engineer George S. Morison and his many bridges, including nearly 50 pages about the Memphis Bridge (Frisco Bridge).
The Memphis Railroad Bridges
The Frisco Bridge
Recent Photos of the Frisco Bridge

Truss bridges in the United States
Railroad bridges in Arkansas
Railroad bridges in Tennessee
Bridges over the Mississippi River
Bridges in Memphis, Tennessee
Bridges completed in 1892
BNSF Railway bridges
St. Louis–San Francisco Railway
Historic Civil Engineering Landmarks
Transportation in Crittenden County, Arkansas
Buildings and structures in West Memphis, Arkansas
Steel bridges in the United States
Cantilever bridges in the United States
Historic American Engineering Record in Arkansas
Historic American Engineering Record in Tennessee
Interstate railroad bridges in the United States
1892 establishments in Arkansas
1892 establishments in Tennessee